Cibyra is a genus of moths of the family Hepalidae. There are 50 described species, found throughout Central and South America.

Species 
Cibyra assa - Mexico
Cibyra biedermanni - Brazil
Cibyra brasiliensis - Brazil
Cibyra brunnea - Venezuela/Peru
Cibyra catharinae - Brazil
Cibyra danieli - Brazil
Cibyra dorita - Brazil
Cibyra epigramma - Brazil
Cibyra equatorialis - Ecuador
Cibyra exclamans - Brazil
Cibyra fasslii - Colombia
Cibyra ferruginosa - Brazil
Cibyra foetterlei - Brazil
Cibyra forsteri - Bolivia
Cibyra gugelmanni - Mexico
Cibyra guyanensis - French Guiana
Cibyra helga - Brazil
Cibyra indicata - Ecuador
Cibyra jeanneli - Brazil
Cibyra jordani - Brazil
Cibyra lagopus - Suriname
Cibyra magua - Peru
Cibyra mahagoniatus - Bolivia
Cibyra mexicanensis - Mexico
Cibyra monoargenteus - Brazil
Cibyra munona - Brazil
Cibyra nigrovenosalis - Brazil
Cibyra oreas - Brazil
Cibyra paropus - Ecuador
Cibyra petropolisiensis - Brazil
Cibyra philiponi - Brazil
Cibyra pittionii - Brazil
Cibyra pluriargenteus - Brazil
Cibyra poltrona - Brazil
Cibyra prytanes - Brazil
Cibyra rileyi - Brazil
Cibyra saguanmachica - Colombia
Cibyra schausi - Brazil
Cibyra serta - Mexico
Cibyra simplex - Brazil
Cibyra sladeni - Brazil
Cibyra spitzi - Brazil
Cibyra terea - Panama/Mexico
Cibyra tesselloides - Brazil/Paraguay
Cibyra thisbe - Colombia
Cibyra trilinearis - Colombia
Cibyra umbrifera - Brazil
Cibyra verresi - Brazil
Cibyra yungas - Bolivia
Cibyra zischkai - Bolivia

External links
Hepialidae genera

Hepialidae
Exoporia genera
Taxa named by Francis Walker (entomologist)